The 2017 ICF World Junior and U23 Canoe Slalom Championships took place in Bratislava, Slovakia from 18 to 23 July 2017 under the auspices of the International Canoe Federation (ICF) at the Čunovo Water Sports Centre. It was the 19th edition of the competition for Juniors (U18) and the 6th edition for the Under 23 category. The C2 mixed event was held for the first time at these championships. It was only contested at the Under 23 level and there was no C2 mixed team event. No medals were awarded for the junior C2 event and the U23 C2 team event due to low number of participating nations. The junior C2 team event did not take place.

A total of 400 athletes from 47 countries participated at the championships.

Medal summary

Men

Canoe

Junior

U23

Kayak

Junior

U23

Women

Canoe

Junior

U23

Kayak

Junior

U23

Mixed

Canoe

U23

Medal table

References

External links
Official website
International Canoe Federation

ICF World Junior and U23 Canoe Slalom Championships
ICF World Junior and U23 Canoe Slalom Championships
2017 in Slovak sport
Canoeing and kayaking competitions in Slovakia
Sports competitions in Bratislava
International sports competitions hosted by Slovakia
July 2017 sports events in Europe